is a railway station located in the city of Kitaakita, Akita Prefecture, Japan, operated by the third sector railway operator Akita Nairiku Jūkan Railway.

Lines
Katsurae Station is served by the Nariku Line, and is located 20.5 km from the terminus of the line at Takanosu Station.

Station layout
The station consists of one side platform serving a single bi-directional track. The station is unattended.

Adjacent stations

History
Katsurae Station opened on November 15, 1935 as a station on the Japan National Railways (JNR) serving the village of Maeda, Akita. The line was extended on to Aniai Station by September 25, 1936. The line was privatized on November 1, 1986, becoming the Akita Nairiku Jūkan Railway.

Surrounding area
 
Ani River
Moriyoshi Junior High School

External links

 Nairiku Railway Station information 

Railway stations in Japan opened in 1935
Railway stations in Akita Prefecture
Kitaakita